This Could Be Heaven is the fourth studio album by Swedish singer Pandora. It was released in December 1997 by Universal Records. The album peaked at number 19 in Finland.

The album was re-released in Sweden in 1998 and included the bonus track "Spirit to Win" which was recorded as the official track of the 1998 Winter Olympics in Nagano, Japan.

Track listing 
 "Single Life" (Mark Taylor, Paul Colgate) – 3:36
 "Everybody's Livin' It Up" (Taylor, Paul Barry, Steve Torch) – 4:10
 "Shout It Out"  (featuring Martin Carboo)  (Hendrik Andersson, Martin Ankelius, Peter Johansson) – 3:16
 "Show Me What You Got"  (featuring Patrick Ntumba)  (Martin Ankelius, Peter Johansson) – 3:22
 "Great Life" (Mats Nyman, Pandora) – 3:54
 "If This Isn't Love (What Is It)" (Nyman, Pandora) – 4:20
 "This Could Be Heaven" (Taylor, Barry) – 3:55
 "Let It Go" (Andersson, Ankelius, Johansson) – 3:02
 "(You'll Always Be) The Love of My Life" (Taylor, Barry) – 4:00
 "Mr. Right" (Andersson, Johansson) – 3:32
 "I'll Be There for You" (Andersson, Ankelius, Johansson) – 4:32
 "I Welcome You" (Nyman, Pandora) – 3:43
 "You Drive Me Crazy"  (featuring Martin Carboo)  (Andersson, Johansson) – 3:15
 "I Feel Free" (Graham Stack, Taylor, Barry) – 3:38
 "Spirit To Win" (Klaus Maria Weigurt, Enrico Joseph) – 3:09 (1998 bonus track)

Charts

Certifications

Release history

References 

1997 albums
Pandora (singer) albums
EMI Records albums
Universal Records albums